Haplogroup R1, or R-M173, is a Y-chromosome DNA haplogroup. A primary subclade of Haplogroup R (R-M207), it is defined by the SNP M173. The other primary subclade of Haplogroup R is Haplogroup R2 (R-M479).

Males carrying R-M173 in modern populations appear to comprise two subclades: R1a and R1b, which are found mainly in populations native to Eurasia (except East and Southeast Asia). R-M173 contains the majority of representatives of haplogroup R in the form of its subclades, R1a and R1b (and ).

Structure

Origins
The origins of haplogroup R1 remain unclear. It and its sibling clade R2 (R-M79) are the only immediate descendants of Haplogroup R (R-M207). R is a direct descendant of Haplogroup P1 (P-M45), and a sibling clade, therefore, of Haplogroup Q (Q-M242).

No examples of the basal subclade, R1* have yet been identified in living individuals or ancient remains. However, the parent clade, R* was evidently present in upper paleolithic-era individuals (24,000 years BP), from the Mal'ta-Buret' culture, in Siberia. The autosomal DNA of the Mal'ta-Buret' people is a part of a group known to scholars of population genetics as Ancient North Eurasians (ANE). The first major descendant haplogroups of R1*, R1a and R1b, appeared subsequently in mesolithic Central Asia and Eastern Europe, with genotypes derived, to varying degrees, from ANE.

General distribution

Eurasia
Haplogroup R1 is  very common throughout all of Eurasia except East Asia and Southeast Asia. Its distribution is believed to be associated with the re-settlement of Eurasia following the Last Glacial Maximum. Its main subgroups are R1a and R1b. One subclade of haplogroup R1b (especially R1b1a2), is the most common haplogroup in Western Europe and Bashkortostan , while a subclade of haplogroup R1a (especially haplogroup R1a1) is the most common haplogroup in large parts of South Asia, Eastern Europe, Central Asia, Western China, and South Siberia.

Individuals whose Y-chromosomes possess all the mutations on internal nodes of the Y-DNA tree down to and including M207 (which defines Haplogroup R) but which display neither the M173 mutation that defines haplogroup R1 nor the M479 mutation that defines Haplogroup R2 are categorized as belonging to group R* (R-M207). R* has been found in 10.3% (10/97) of a sample of Burusho and 6.8% (3/44) of a sample of Kalash from northern Pakistan .

Americas

The presence of haplogroup R1 among Indigenous Americans groups is a matter of controversy. It is now the most common haplogroup after the various Q-M242, especially in North America in Ojibwe people at 79%, Chipewyan 62%, Seminole 50%, Cherokee 47%, Dogrib 40% and Tohono O'odham 38%.

Some authorities point to the greater similarity between haplogroup R1 subclades found in North America and those found in Siberia (e.g. Lell  and Raghavan ), suggesting prehistoric immigration from Asia and/or Beringia.

Africa
One subclade, now known as R1b1a2 (R-V88), is found only at high frequencies amongst populations native to West Africa, such as the Fulani, and is believed to reflect a prehistoric back-migration from Eurasia to Africa.

Subclade distribution

R1a (R-M420)

The split of R1a (M420) is computed to ca 25,000  years ago (95% CI: 21, 300–29, 000 BP), or roughly the last glacial maximum. A large study performed in 2014 (Underhill et al. 2015), using 16,244 individuals from over 126 populations from across Eurasia, concluded that there was compelling evidence that "the initial episodes of haplogroup R1a diversification likely occurred in the vicinity of present-day Iran."
The subclade M417 (R1a1a1) diversified ca. 5,800 years ago. The distribution of M417-subclades R1-Z282 (including R1-Z280) in Central- and Eastern Europe and R1-Z93 in Asia suggests that R1a1a diversified within the Eurasian Steppes or the Middle East and Caucasus region. The place of origin of these subclades plays a role in the debate about the origins of the Indo-Europeans.
High frequencies  of haplogroup R1a  are found amongst West Bengal Brahmins (72%), and  Uttar Pradesh Brahmins, (67%), the Ishkashimi (68%), the Tajik population of Panjikent (64%), the Kyrgyz population of Central Kyrgyzstan (63.5%), Sorbs (63.39%), Bihar Brahmins (60.53%), Shors (58.8%), Poles (56.4%), Teleuts (55.3%), South Altaians (58.1%), Ukrainians (50%) and Russians (50%) (and ).

R1b (R-M343)

Haplogroup R1b probably originated in Eurasia prior to or during the last glaciation. It is the most common haplogroup in Western Europe and Bashkortostan. It may have survived the last glacial maximum, in refugia near the southern Ural Mountains and Aegean Sea..

It is also present at lower frequencies throughout Eastern Europe, with higher diversity than in western Europe, suggesting an ancient migration of haplogroup R1b from the east. Haplogroup R1b is also found at various frequencies in many different populations near the Ural Mountains and Central Asia, its likely region of origin.

There may be a correlation between this haplogroup and the spread of Centum branch Indo-European languages in southern and western Europe. For instance, the modern incidence of R1b reaches between 60% and 90% of the male population in most parts of Spain, Portugal, France, Britain and Ireland. The clade is also found at frequencies of up to 90% in the Chad Basin, and is also present in North Africa, where its frequency surpasses 10% in some parts of Algeria.

Although it is rare in South Asia, some populations show relatively high percentages for R1b. These include Lambadi showing 37% , Hazara 32% , and Agharia (in East India) at 30% . Besides these, R1b has appeared in  Balochi (8%), Bengalis (6.5%), Chenchu (2%), Makrani (5%), Newars (10.6%), Pallan (3.5%) and Punjabis (7.6%) (and ).

R-M343 (previously called Hg1 and Eu18) is the most frequent Y-chromosome haplogroup in Europe. It is  an offshoot of R-M173, characterised by the M343 marker. An overwhelming majority of members of R-M343 are classified as R-P25 (defined by the P25 marker), the remainder as R-M343*. Its frequency is highest in Western Europe (and due to modern European immigration, in parts of the Americas). The majority of R-M343-carriers of European descent belong to the R-M269 (R1b1a2) descendant line.

See also

History of Eurasia

Genetics

Y-DNA R-M207 subclades

References

Works cited

 

. Also 

R1
Human evolution
R